Albie may refer to:

Albie (given name)
Albie (TV series), British animated series

See also
Alby (disambiguation)